Martin Geissler (born 1971) is a Scottish news reader, broadcast journalist and correspondent for BBC Scotland News.

Career
Geissler joined the Scottish bureau of the then-recently launched Sky News in 1991. Later he joined Grampian Television (now STV North) working on the nightly regional news programme North Tonight before moving to Tyne Tees Television as a reporter on Tyne Tees Today.

Geissler joined Scottish Television (now STV Central) in February 1994 as a reporter, sports presenter and newsreader  for Scotland Today. In 1998, he moved to Sky Sports as Scotland Correspondent, then rejoined Scotland Today eighteen months later.

He joined ITN in April 2002 as ITV News' Scotland Correspondent but was also involved with coverage of major international stories including the Second Gulf War, the Asian tsunami and Hurricane Katrina in New Orleans. In May 2006 he became the Africa Correspondent. Reports from Zimbabwe were nominated for Emmy, BAFTA and Royal Television Society awards. In August 2010 he became Europe Correspondent and in 2012 he became a UK-based correspondent.

As of February 2019, Martin had joined BBC Scotland as co-anchor of the new BBC Scotland channel's News service.

Personal life
Geissler has won various awards for his work around the world, most recently for his coverage of the opioid epidemic in the USA.

He lives in Muckhart, a village in Clackmannanshire. Married with two children, Geissler is a keen supporter of Heart of Midlothian F.C.

References

External links 

1971 births
ITN newsreaders and journalists
Living people
People educated at George Watson's College
Scottish journalists
STV News newsreaders and journalists
BBC Scotland newsreaders and journalists
Year of birth uncertain